The women's 200 metres competition at the 2002 Asian Games in Busan, South Korea was held on 9–10 October at the Busan Asiad Main Stadium.

Schedule
All times are Korea Standard Time (UTC+09:00)

Records

Results 
Legend
DNS — Did not start

1st round 
 Qualification: First 3 in each heat (Q) and the next 2 fastest (q) advance to the final.

Heat 1 
 Wind: −0.2 m/s

Heat 2 
 Wind: +0.3 m/s

Final 
 Wind: −0.2 m/s

References

External links 
Results - Heats
Results - Final

Athletics at the 2002 Asian Games
2002